Georges Wagemans (born 1881, date of death unknown) was a Belgian figure skater. He competed in the 1920 Summer Olympics and 1924 Winter Olympics along with Georgette Herbos.

References

1881 births
Place of birth missing
Date of death missing
Place of death missing
Belgian male pair skaters
Olympic figure skaters of Belgium
Figure skaters at the 1920 Summer Olympics
Figure skaters at the 1924 Winter Olympics